Dr. Bobby Jones (born September 18, 1939 in Henry, Tennessee, United States) is an American Gospel music singer television host, and radio broadcaster from Nashville, Tennessee and the host and executive producer of several cable television gospel music programs including the former Bobby Jones Gospel.

Dr. Jones is referred to as the Ed Sullivan of gospel music. He has given numerous gospel stars a platform to showcase their talents and has many trophies racked up at his Nashville home for his contributions to music. Bobby Jones Gospel was canceled and went off the air in 2015.

On radio, he is the host of The Bobby Jones Radio Show, a daily one-hour music program distributed by American Urban Radio Networks. Previously, he hosted the weekly Bobby Jones Gospel Countdown which ran for more than a decade via AURN.

Career
Jones began his television career in 1976, when Nashville station WSM-TV (now WSMV) gave him a slot on the Sunday morning schedule with Nashville Gospel. That show continued for some 25 years, with a number of hosts.

Jones launched his variety program, Bobby Jones Gospel, on BET in 1980. His shows figure prominently in the channel's Sunday lineup, consistently ranking in the Top 5 of overall BET weekly programming. In addition to his work for BET, Jones produced and hosted a similar half-hour program for WDCN-TV (now WNPT), Nashville's public television outlet, during the early 1980s. The show was seen early Saturday evenings.

Bobby Jones Gospel lays claim to offering the first prime exposure to several Gospel music solo artists and groups including Kirk Franklin, Mary Mary, Yolanda Adams, and Smokie Norful. Other artists featured have included Albertina Walker, Patti LaBelle, Dorothy Norwood, and Helen Baylor.

Jones also hosts shows for other television networks including Bobby Jones' Next Generation on the Gospel Music Channel and Bobby Jones Presents for The Word Network.

On radio, he hosts The Bobby Jones Radio Show, a daily one-hour music program distributed by American Urban Radio Networks.  Dr. Jones previously hosted the weekly The Bobby Jones Gospel Countdown which ran for more than a decade on AURN.

Jones also oversees the Nashville Super Choir.  The choral ensemble boasts prominent soloists and serves as the vocal collective for his BET series.

Jones hosts a bi-annual International Gospel Industry Retreat in Las Vegas, Nevada and Hollywood, Florida.  He also helped spearhead an initiative for the Gospel Complex for Education & Preservation in Fort Lauderdale, Florida, a museum that will host Gospel music artifacts and serve as an information center for the history of urban contemporary Gospel music.

In 1984, he won a Grammy Award for the Best Soul Gospel Performance By A Duo Or Group with Barbara Mandrell for "I'm So Glad I'm Standing Here Today." Jones is also the recipient of a Dove Award, three Stellar Awards, and a presidential commendation from President George W. Bush.

Jones has authored two books.  In 2000, his memoir, Make A Joyful Noise (St. Martins Press) included chapters about his tiff with the Winans family and his personal conversations with the Rev. James Cleveland.  Both topics were controversial and caused some friction with Gospel's first family and Cleveland's music organization, the Gospel Music Workshop of America. In 1999, Jones released Touched By God (Simon & Schuster), a collection of inspirational stories by top Gospel artists about how God has changed their lives. Dr. Bobby Jones, leader of The Nashville Super Choir, has now opened his own production studio, Visions, located in Nashville.

Personal life
Jones has a wife, Ethel, and they have a daughter, Sonnetta. He graduated with a B.S. in elementary education from Tennessee State University, an Ed.D. degree from Vanderbilt University and a Th.D. from  Payne's Theological Seminary.  Dr. Jones is a member of Phi Beta Sigma fraternity.

References

7. ^https://www.vibe.com/2018/03/bobby-jones-why-bobby-jones-gospel-was-cancelled/

External links
The Bobby Jones Radio Show, on AURN.com and AURNInspirational.com
Bobby Jones Gospel Countdown

Living people
1939 births
African-American Christians
American gospel singers
Singers from Nashville, Tennessee
People from Henry County, Tennessee
Grammy Award winners
African-American television personalities
20th-century African-American male singers
Television producers from Tennessee